”Ioan Popescu” Pedagogical High School (Romanian: Liceul Pedagogic ”Ioan Popescu”) is a high school located in Bârlad, Vaslui County, Romania.
Today, along with Pedagogical Profilies, the school has a wider vocational programs (Fine Arts, Musical, Sports) and classes for Theoretical Program (English and French Major). The school  also includes a Kindergarten where students from Pedagogical Profile can make their apprenticeship.

History 
The school was established on 29 November 1870, under the name ”Prince Ferdinard” Teacher Training  College ( Romanian: Școala Normală ”Principele Ferdinand”), and it was the second oldest pedagogical school in Moldovian Region and the sixth oldest of this kind in The Romanian United Principalities. In 1894, within the Pedagogical school, is founded an Apprenticeship School for the future teachers to practice.

In his long histories, the school activated in various building (Panainte Velicovici s Building, The new building in North of the town that was burned in WW2, G.R.Codreanu High School, School Complex Bârlad, to name a few ), until 15 September 2001 when it was finely moved to actual site, on Lirei Street.
The school name was also changed over time: ”Prince Ferdinard” Teacher Training  College”, Pedagogical Normal School, ”Alexandru Vlahuță” Pedagogical School. Since 1 September 2014 the school has been called ”Ioan Popescu” after its founder, and first principal.

Lines of studies and specialisations 

1.Vocational studies

a)Pedagogical Profile:

Teacher for Elementary School and Kindergarten
Instructor for Extracurricular Activities

b)Artistic Profile:

Artistic Technique Technician
Instructor of Music
Theater Instructor (discontinued)

c)Sports Profile

Sport Instructor

2. Theoretical Studies

English Major
French Major (discontinued)
3.Kindergarten

References 

Schools in Vaslui County
Educational institutions established in 1870
Bârlad
High schools in Romania
1870 establishments in Romania